Physeterostemon is a genus of flowering plants belonging to the family Melastomataceae.

Its native range is Northeastern Brazil.

Species:

Physeterostemon aonae 
Physeterostemon fiaschii 
Physeterostemon gomesii 
Physeterostemon jardimii 
Physeterostemon thomasii

References

Melastomataceae
Melastomataceae genera